Melissa Shook (April 18, 1939 – August 27, 2020) was an American documentary photographer, artist and educator. Her work has been shown in group exhibitions at the Museum of Modern Art in New York, and held in the collection there and at the Metropolitan Museum of Art in New York and Moderna Museet in Stockholm,

Life and work
Shook was born in New York, New York on April 18, 1939. She studied at Bard College and the Art Students League of New York. Shook taught at Massachusetts Institute of Technology's Creative Photo Lab in 1974, and at the University of Massachusetts Boston from 1975 to 2005. Her subjects included her daughter; a series of daily self-portraits; a shelter for homeless men and women; and a wheelchair basketball team. She died in Chelsea, Massachusetts on August 27, 2020.

Publications
Streets are for Nobody: Homeless Women Speak. Boston: Boston Center for the Arts, 1991. With Jane Peterson.
My Suffolk Downs. Pressed Wafer, 2012. . Poetry and photography.
He Says, She Says, I Say, and Nobody Tells the Truth, Whatever That Is, on the Backside of Suffolk Downs: a narrative by Melissa Shook. WordTech, 2014. .

Group exhibitions
Recent Acquisitions, 1974–1976, Museum of Modern Art, New York, 1976
Pictures by Women: a History of Modern Photography, Museum of Modern Art, New York, 2010/11

Collections
Shook's work is held in the following permanent collections:
Center for Creative Photography, University of Arizona, Arizona: 83 prints (as of June 2016)
International Center of Photography, New York: 1 print (as of April 2021)
Light Work, Syracuse, New York: 8 prints (as of April 2021)
Nelson-Atkins Museum of Art, Kansas City, MO: 208 prints (as of April 2021)
Metropolitan Museum of Art, New York: 2 prints (as of April 2021)
Moderna Museet, Stockholm, Sweden
Museum of Modern Art, New York: 37 prints (as of April 2021)

References

21st-century American photographers
20th-century American photographers
American women photographers
Photographers from Massachusetts
Bard College alumni
2020 deaths
1939 births
21st-century American women artists
20th-century American women